Adat Se Majboor is a 1982 Indian Hindi-language film directed by Ambrish Sangal, starring Mithun Chakraborty, Mohan Gokhale, Neena Gupta, Gloria Mahanty, Bijainee Misra and Lalatendu Rath.

Cast 
Mithun Chakraborty - Shankar Shastri 
Ranjeeta - Neetu Verma
Rameshwari - Salma / Shanti
Madan Puri - Dinanath Shastri 
Amrish Puri - Joginder Singh / Agnihotri
Om Shivpuri - Dr. Verma
Sudha Shivpuri - Mrs. Verma
Mohan Choti - Ramu
Padmini Kapila - Madam Zorro
C.S. Dubey - Dheeru Bhai
Moolchand - Bachchu Bhai
Master Fareed - Young Shankar
Baby Priya - Young Neetu
Pappu - Young Ramu
Dulari - Nadira Shaikh
Ranvir Raj - Agnihotri's Manager

Soundtrack
The film has 6 songs, written by Indivar & Nida Fazli and composed by Usha Khanna.

"Ram Kare Ke Umar Qaid (Female)" – Lata Mangeshkar
"Ya Rehmat-E-Alam" – Lata Mangeshkar
"Ram Kare Ke Umar Qaid Hame (Male)" – Shailendra Singh
"Aankh Dil Ki Zubaan Hoti Hai" – Usha Mangeshkar, Mahendra Kapoor, Shabbir Kumar
"Tera Pyar Mila" – Asha Bhosle
"Andar Ki Baat Hai" – Shailendra Singh

References

External links
 

Films scored by Usha Khanna
1982 films
1980s Hindi-language films